Esther Julia "Daysi" Duporty Torres (born February 9, 1971 in Guantánamo) is a retired sprinter from Cuba, who competed at three consecutive Summer Olympics, starting in 1992. She set her personal best (50.61) in the women's 400 metres event on 6 September 1994 in Madrid.

Career

Duporty had success as a young athlete at the Central American and Caribbean Junior Championships, where she was runner-up in the women's 200 m behind Revoli Campbell in 1990. She began competing at the top level of athletics in 1991: after winning a silver medal with the Cuban 4x400 metres women's relay team at the 1991 Pan American Games, she competed at the 1991 World Championships in Athletics. She reached the semi-finals of the 200 m and she was sixth in the 4×100 metres relay, forming part of a team with Pan American champion Liliana Allen. She made her first Olympic appearance at the 1992 Barcelona Olympics in the relay, but the team was disqualified in the event.

She stepped up a distance at the 1993 Central American and Caribbean Games, winning the gold medal over 400 metres as well as the 400 m relay title with Cuba. She also won the 200 m bronze medal at the 1993 CAC Championships (which was won by fellow Cuban Idalmis Bonne). She helped the Cuban team to sixth place again at the 1993 World Championships in Athletics, this time setting a Cuban record of 42.89 seconds.

The 1994 season did not feature a major championships, but she picked up medals elsewhere: she took the relay bronze after coming fifth in the individual 400 m at the 1994 IAAF World Cup and won two further relay medals at the 1994 Goodwill Games. She was a semi-finalist in the 400 m at the 1995 World Championships in Athletics, but it was at the 1995 Pan American Games where she excelled, winning the 400 m individual and relay titles as well as coming fourth in the 200 m. She took part in her second Olympic relay at the 1996 Summer Olympics and helped the Cuban team to sixth place in the 4×400 m final. At the 1996 Ibero-American Championships, she became the 400 m champion with a winning run of 50.84 seconds.

She regained her 400 m and relay titles at the 1997 CAC Championships. At the 1998 Ibero-American Championships she won the 200 m bronze behind Lucrécia Jardim and Liliana Allen. In the final years of her international career, she was confined to the relay races at the major championships. She won the gold with the Cuban 4×400 m relay team at the 1999 Pan American Games and seventh in the final at the 1999 World Championships in Athletics. In her third and final Olympic appearance she finished eighth in the women's 400 m relay.

Duporty won the Cuban title over 400 m on five separate occasions between 1994 and 2000 – a streak interrupted only by Ana Fidelia Quirot in 1996 and Zulia Calatayud in 1999.

International competitions

References

External links
 
 Profile at trackfield.brinkster.net
 

1971 births
Living people
Cuban female sprinters
Athletes (track and field) at the 1992 Summer Olympics
Athletes (track and field) at the 1996 Summer Olympics
Athletes (track and field) at the 2000 Summer Olympics
Athletes (track and field) at the 1991 Pan American Games
Athletes (track and field) at the 1995 Pan American Games
Athletes (track and field) at the 1999 Pan American Games
Olympic athletes of Cuba
Sportspeople from Guantánamo
Pan American Games medalists in athletics (track and field)
Pan American Games gold medalists for Cuba
Pan American Games silver medalists for Cuba
Universiade medalists in athletics (track and field)
Central American and Caribbean Games gold medalists for Cuba
Competitors at the 1993 Central American and Caribbean Games
Goodwill Games medalists in athletics
Universiade silver medalists for Cuba
Central American and Caribbean Games medalists in athletics
Medalists at the 1997 Summer Universiade
Competitors at the 1994 Goodwill Games
Medalists at the 1991 Pan American Games
Medalists at the 1995 Pan American Games
Medalists at the 1999 Pan American Games
Olympic female sprinters
20th-century Cuban women